The Cyprus Davis Cup team represents Cyprus in Davis Cup tennis competition and are governed by the Cyprus Tennis Federation.

Cyprus currently competes in the Europe Group III.

History
Cyprus competed in its first Davis Cup in 1985.  They lost their first 10 ties before finally defeating the Congo. Due to incurring so many losses, Cyprus was relegated to the fourth and last zonal group in 1997. The team began to record regular wins when in the year 2000 a 14-year-old Marcos Baghdatis made his Davis Cup debut. In 2007, Cyprus returned to the Zonal Group II and recorded their best result in 2009 where they fell one match shy of being promoted to the Zonal Group I.

Home Court
The first ever tie Cyprus competed in was held in Nicosia against Ireland. The team continued to play out of the Cyprus capital of Nicosia until 2010 when the team played in Spyros Kyprianou Athletic Centre located in Limassol (home of Marcos Baghdatis). 2021 event will take place at Herodotou Tennis Academy in Larnaca.

Current team (2022 Davis Cup)
Player information and rankings

Recent performances
Here is the list of all match-ups since 1985, when Cyprus began playing Davis Cup.

1980s

1990s

2000s

2010s

See also
Davis Cup
Cyprus Fed Cup team

External links

Davis Cup teams
Tennis
Davis Cup